Jānis Ivanovs (9 October 1906 in Babri, Preiļi – 27 March 1983 in Riga) was a Soviet and Latvian classical music composer.

In 1931, he graduated from the Latvian State Conservatory in Riga. In 1944, he joined the conservatory's faculty, becoming a full professor in 1955. He is regarded as being the most distinguished Latvian symphonist. His love of melody is evident in each of his compositions, and forms the essence of his works. He often drew inspiration from the native songs of the Latgale district in eastern Latvia. His grasp of orchestral color and musical texture were highly regarded by his colleagues. The Latvian composer and music critic, Marģeris Zariņš, described Ivanovs' symphonies as "like ancient Greek tragedies, filled with ecstasy and purification." He is mostly remembered for his twenty-one symphonies. Nevertheless, he composed in many other fields, including five symphonic poems, concertos for piano, violin and cello, three string quartets, and numerous vocal, piano and various chamber works.

He became the People's Artist of the USSR in 1965, was awarded the Stalin Prize in 1950 and Latvian SSR State Prize in 1959 and 1970.

Compositions

Symphonies
 No. 1 in B-flat minor Poema Sinfonia (1933)
 No. 2 in D minor (1937)
 No. 3 in F minor (1938)
 No. 4 Atlantis with female choir (1941)
 No. 5 in C major (1945)
 No. 6 Latgalian (1949)
 No. 7 in C minor (1953)
 No. 8 in B minor (1956)
 No. 9 (1960)
 No. 10 (1963)
 No. 11 in E-flat minor (1965)
 No. 12 in C major Sinfonia Energica (1967)
 No. 13 in D minor Sinfonia Humana (1969)
 No. 14 Sinfonia da Camera for string orchestra (1971)
 No. 15 Sinfonia Ipsa (1972)
 No. 16 (1974)
 No. 17 in C major (1976)
 No. 18 (1977)
 No. 19 (1979)
 No. 20 in E-flat major (1981)
 No. 21 in C major (1983, Unfinished)

Tone poems
 Rainbow (1939)
 Lāčplēsis (1957)
 Poema Luttuoso for String Orchestra (1966)
 Novella Brevis (1982)

Other orchestral works
 Violin Concerto in E minor (1951)
 Cello Concerto in B minor (1952)
 Piano Concerto in D minor (1959)

Chamber music
 String Quartet no. 1 (1931/32)
 String Quartet no. 2 in C major (1946)
 String Quartet no. 3 (1961)
 Piano Trio (1976, published 1979)

Piano works
 Three Sketches
 Sonata Brevis
 Andante Replicado in E-flat minor

References

External links
Onno van Rijen's Soviet Composer Site

1906 births
1983 deaths
20th-century classical composers
20th-century conductors (music)
20th-century male musicians
People from Dvinsky Uyezd
People from Preiļi
Latvian Academy of Music alumni
Third convocation members of the Supreme Soviet of the Soviet Union
Fourth convocation members of the Supreme Soviet of the Soviet Union
People's Artists of the Latvian Soviet Socialist Republic
People's Artists of the USSR
Stalin Prize winners
Recipients of the Order of Lenin
Recipients of the Order of the Red Banner of Labour
Male classical composers
Latvian classical musicians
Latvian composers
Latvian conductors (music)
Soviet classical musicians
Soviet conductors (music)
Soviet film score composers
Soviet male composers
Soviet music educators
Burials at Forest Cemetery, Riga